Banksia kippistiana is a species of shrub that is endemic to Western Australia. It has linear, pinnatifid leaves with ten to twenty lobes on each side, heads of up to eighty yellow and cream-coloured flowers, and elliptical follicles.

Description
It has stems that are woolly-hairy when young. There are between ten and twenty triangular lobes on each side of the leaves.

Taxonomy and naming
This species was first formally described in 1856 by Carl Meissner who gave it the name Dryandra kippistiana and published the description in de Candolle's Prodromus Systematis Naturalis Regni Vegetabilis from specimens collected by James Drummond in the Swan River Colony. The specific epithet (kippistiana) commemorates Richard Kippist, librarian to the Linnean Society of London.

In 1996, Alex George described two varieties of the species in the journal Nuytsia:
 Banksia kippistiana var. kippistiana that does not form a lignotuber and has shorter flower parts and bracts than var. paenepeccata;

In 2007 Austin Mast and Kevin Thiele transferred all dryandras to the genus Banksia and renamed this species Banksia kippistiana. They also changed the genus names of the two varieties and the changes are accepted at the Australian Plant Census.

Distribution and habitat
Banksia kippistiana grows in kwongan and occurs between Eneabba, Mount Lesueur and New Norcia, also in scattered locations to the south-eastern suburbs of Perth.

Conservation status
Banksia kippistiana is classified as "not threatened" by the Western Australian Government Department of Parks and Wildlife, but var. paenepeccata is classified as "Priority Three" meaning that it is poorly known and known from only a few locations but is not under imminent threat.

References

 

kippistiana
Plants described in 1856